Nashville Soccer Club was an American professional soccer team based in Nashville, Tennessee. Founded in 2016, the team made its debut in the USL Championship in 2018.

A Major League Soccer (MLS) franchise was awarded to Nashville in December 2017. The team, also known as Nashville SC, began play in 2020.

History 
The club was announced on May 19, 2016. The ownership group consisted of David Dill, president and chief operating officer of LifePoint Health; Christopher Redhage, co-founder of ProviderTrust, a health care software company, and former pro soccer player; and Marcus Whitney, president of Jumpstart Foundry, a health care innovation fund, and former chairman of Nashville FC, the city's existing amateur team.

The team acquired its team name, logo, and color scheme from the amateur Nashville FC, established in 2013, in exchange for a 1 percent equity stake in the USL team and a voting seat on its board. In September 2016, the USL team changed its name to Nashville Soccer Club, or Nashville SC.

Gary Smith, who led the Colorado Rapids to an MLS Cup championship in 2010, was hired as head coach and technical director on April 12, 2017.

On March 4, 2017, John Ingram, under the entity Nashville Holdings LLC, bought a majority stake in DMD Soccer, the ownership group of Nashville SC. Ingram also headed up the bid to bring an MLS franchise to Nashville, and the partnership between Ingram and Nashville SC was seen as an effort to present a united front to MLS after Nashville was named one of ten finalist cities for four MLS franchises. On December 20, 2017, Nashville was selected as MLS' 24th franchise. The MLS team began play in 2020.

On February 10, 2018, Nashville SC competed in their first game; a preseason exhibition match against Atlanta United FC of MLS. In the rain-soaked contest, Nashville was defeated by Atlanta, 3–1, in front of 9,059 spectators. Forward Ropapa Mensah, the youngest player on the Nashville squad, scored the first goal in franchise history in the 64th minute. Their first regular season game, a 2–0 loss, was played against Louisville City FC on March 17 at Louisville Slugger Field. The club's first regular season home game was played on March 24 against the Pittsburgh Riverhounds at Nissan Stadium. The game was attended by 18,922 people and ended in a scoreless tie. Nashville recorded its first win on March 31 against Bethlehem Steel FC. Forward Michael Cox scored on a penalty kick in the fifth minute to secure the 1–0 win. The same season, NSC got to the USL playoffs but was knocked out in the first round by FC Cincinnati in penalties.

Stadium 

The team played primarily at First Tennessee Park. The stadium's primary tenant is the Nashville Sounds, a Triple-A Minor League Baseball club. It has fixed seating for 8,500 people, but can accommodate up to 10,000 with additional berm space and group areas. The team played their entire 2019 schedule at the park.

During the 2018 season, the team played twice at Nissan Stadium.

Sponsorship

Broadcasting 
Nashville SC matches were broadcast locally on MYTV30 and nationwide on ESPN+. John Freeman was the play-by-play broadcaster. Color analysts included former Vanderbilt University women's soccer coach Ronnie Woodard, Eddie Carvacho, and local radio host Braden Gall.

Most home and away matches were broadcast live on 94.9 FM Game 2, an ESPN Radio affiliate. Wes Boling was the play-by-play broadcaster.

Spanish-language radio broadcasts were carried by El Jefe 96.7 FM.

Supporters 

Nashville SC's original organized supporter group is The Roadies. Established in February 2014 with the creation of Nashville FC, the city's NPSL amateur franchise with the club's transition from NPSL amateur to USL pro status and accompanying rebranding as NSC, The Roadies similarly transitioned to maintain their support for "Our Town, Our Club". The group supports local charities including Oasis Center and Soccer for the Nations.

The Assembly supporter group was created in early 2017 and has had a presence in the supporters section at games.

Year-by-year

This is a complete list of seasons for the USL franchise. For a season-by-season history including the successor Nashville SC MLS franchise, see List of Nashville SC seasons.

1. Avg. attendance include statistics from league matches only.
2. Top goalscorer(s) includes all goals scored in League, League Playoffs, U.S. Open Cup, CONCACAF Champions League, FIFA Club World Cup, and other competitive continental matches.

Staff

Nashville SC U23 

Nashville SC established Nashville SC U23, an under-23 team in the league then known as the Premier Development League (PDL) and now as USL League Two (USL 2), in 2016. The club began play in 2017 in order to build a pool of players to feed into the USL club for 2018. Martim Galvão was the only PDL team member who made the USL roster. Its home games were played at Vanderbilt University, on both the football and soccer fields. The club has not fielded a U23 side in either the PDL or USL 2 since 2017.

Footnotes

References

External links
 
 USL site

 
2016 establishments in Tennessee
Association football clubs established in 2016
Sports in Nashville, Tennessee
Soccer clubs in Tennessee
Former USL Championship teams